Nothing But the Best: Radio Classics is an official 1994 compilation album by the Christian rock band White Heart. This is the second of two albums by White Heart with the other being Nothing But the Best: Rock Classics, as they were released separately. This collection features songs from both the Sparrow and Star Song years 1986-1994 focusing on their Christian radio hits in AC and CHR/pop, many of them went to number one, where as Rock Classics focuses on their rock cuts from the same period. Radio Classics features a new song, "My Eyes Have Seen", and a full-length version of "Morningstar." A shorter version was heard on their 1992 album Tales of Wonder. Both tracks were released as Christian radio singles from this collection. Session musician Mark Hill was brought in and played bass guitar on both new songs and replaced Anthony Sallee who had left the group after the release of 1993's Highlands. The album debuted and peaked at number 29 on the Billboard Top Christian Albums chart.

Track listing 
All songs written by Mark Gersmehl and Billy Smiley, except where noted.

Note: all tracks produced by Mark Gersmehl and Billy Smiley; (*) - produced by Smiley and White Heart; (**) - produced by White Heart; (***) - produced by Brown Bannister; (****) - produced by Bill Drescher.

Personnel 

On the new tracks
 Rick Florian – lead vocals, backing vocals
 Mark Gersmehl – keyboards, lead vocals, backing vocals
 Billy Smiley – acoustic guitar, backing vocals
 Brian Wooten – rhythm and lead guitars
 Mark Hill – bass guitar (tracks 1 and 2)
 Jon Knox – drums, percussion

Charts

Radio singles

References

1994 compilation albums
White Heart albums